Heptyl acetate (C9H18O2), also known as acetate C-7, is a colorless alcohol-soluble liquid that is the ester formed by the condensation of 1-heptanol and acetic acid.

Heptyl acetate is used as a fruit essence flavoring in foods and as a scent in perfumes. It has a woody, fruity, rumlike odor and a spicy, floral taste with a soapy, fatty texture.

References

Flavors
Perfume ingredients
Food additives
Acetate esters